Hendon may refer to:

Places

Australia 

 Hendon, Queensland, a town in the Southern Downs Region
Hendon, South Australia, a suburb of Adelaide

Canada 

 Hendon, Saskatchewan, a hamlet in Canada

United Kingdom 
Hendon, in the London Borough of Barnet, England
Hendon Central tube station, in London
Hendon railway station, a National Rail station in the West of Hendon in London
Hendon (UK Parliament constituency)
Hendon Police College, London
Hendon Aerodrome, London
Municipal Borough of Hendon, which became part of the London Borough of Barnet in 1965
Hendon Rural District, an administrative district in Middlesex, England from 1894 to 1934
Hendon, Sunderland, in Tyne and Wear, England

People
 Bill Hendon, former U.S. Congressman and POW/MIA activist
 Christine P. Hendon, American electrical engineer and computer scientist
 Ian Hendon, English footballer
 Joanna Hendon, American lawyer
 The Hendon Mob, a group of professional poker players
Hendon Hooker (born 1998), American football player

Other
Fairey Hendon, a 1930s RAF bomber
Hendon F.C., a football club from Hendon, England
Handley Page Hendon, a British torpedo bomber of the 1920s

See also
 Henton (disambiguation)
 Hedon (disambiguation)